International Federation of Amateur SAMBO (Fédération Internationale de SAMBO) is the world governing body for the sport of Sambo.

History
1984 - the FILA Assembly decided to create an independent federation of SAMBO (FIAS). The president of FIAS was elected Spaniard Fernando Compte.

2022 - Unlike most international federations, FIAS has not banned Russian and Belarusians in response to the 2022 Russian invasion of Ukraine.

Summary
 1973-1984: FILA
 1985-1990: FIAS
 1991-1993: FMS and FIAS
 1994-2005: FISA EAST / FIAS WEST
 2006-NOW: FIAS (CURRENT SITUATION)

Events

World Sambo Championships

The World Sambo Championships are the main championships in Sambo and Combat Sambo, organized by the Fédération Internationale de Sambo (FIAS).

European Sambo Championships

Pan American Sambo Championships

African Sambo Championships

Asian Sambo Championships

Asian Sambo Championships is main Sambo and Combat Sambo championships in the Asia. Organized by Asian Sambo Federation (ASF). The First official Asian SAMBO Championship was held in October 1992 in Vladivostok city (Russia). Nineteen (19) Asian SAMBO Championships had been held in the period from 1992 up to 2011. Asian Championships among men and women, youth and juniors are being held annually. In 2005 combat SAMBO (among men) was included into the program of Asian Championships. In 2008 the ASF at the first time held Championships of West and South East Asia in Damascus in 19-20 June and Bangkok in 12-13 July respectively. Central Asian Sambo Championships.

Seniors, Youth, Juniors. [M/F]
Combat SAMBO for Senior [M]

Regional Championships

East Asian Sambo Championships

 2018

Southeast Asian Sambo Championships

 2020

West Asian Sambo Championships

 2008 damascus 
 2009 damascus

Arab Sambo Championships

Central Asian Sambo Championships

 2017

Baltic Sambo Championships

Cup

World Sambo Cup

FIAS World Cup (Sambo World Cup) and Supercup have been contested since 1969, initially held by FILA, and since 1985 by FIAS.

Euro Sambo Cup

Zones
2022:

 Asia - Tashkent, Uzbekistan - 32 Nation
 Oceania - AUS - 1+2 Nation
 Africa - Casablanca - 12+7 Nation
 America - Cali, Colombia - 17+10 Nation
 Europe - Russia, Moscow - 35+2 Nation

Total : 96 + 21 = 117 Nation

Asia
   
Afghanistan KURASH, SAMBO & Belt Wrestling Federation
Bahrain Sambo Federation
Bangladesh SAMBO Association
Chinese Taipei Sambo Association
Sambo Federation of Hong Kong China
SAMBO INDIA Association
Indonesia SAMBO Federation
Iraqi Jujitsu, Sambo and Kurash Federation
Sambo Association of Islamic Republic of Iran
Japan Sambo Federation
Jordan Sambo Committee
Kazakhstan Federation of Sport and Combat Sambo
Sambo Federation of Kyrgyz Republic
Lebanese SAMBO and Judo Federation
Macau Sambo Association
Malaysia Sambo Association
Mongolian Sambo Federation
Nepal Sambo Federation
SAMBO Federation of Pakistan
Palestinian Sambo & Kurash Committee
Pilipinas Sambo Federation
Korea Sambo Federation
Saudi Sambo Committee
Sambo division of Wrestling Federation of Singapore
Sambo Federation Sri Lanka
Syrian Arab Judo and Sambo Federation
Sambo Federation of Republic of Tajikistan
Sambo Association in Thailand
Turkmenistan National Federation of Martial Arts
Sambo Association of Uzbekistan
Vietnam Sambo Association
Yemen Sambo and Judo Federation

Oceania
Members
Sambo Federation of Australia Limited

Candidates:
New Zealand New Zealand Sambo Federation Inc.
Tonga Tonga Sambo Association

Africa
Members
National Algerian Sambo Committee
Angola (Luanda) Sambo & Kurash Association
Cameroonian Nanbudo Federation (National Sambo League)
Ivorian SAMBO Federation
Guinean Federation of Sambo and Associated Disciplines
Mali SAMBO Federation
Mauritius National Sambo Federation
Royal Moroccan Federation of Sambo and Tai-Jitsu
Niger Sambo Federation
Senegalese Association of Sambo
Seychelles Sambo Association
Tunisian SAMBO Federation

Candidates
Benin Beninese Sambo Federation
Botswana Mixed Martial Arts Botswana
Burundi Burundi Sambo Federation
Central African Republic Central African Sambo Federation
Egypt Egyptian Sambo Association
Ghana Ghana Sambo Association
Republic of the Congo Congolese Sambo Committee
South Africa Sambo Federation of South Africa

America
Members
Argentine Sambo Federation
Brazilian Amateur Sambo Confederation
United Canadian Sambo Federation
Chilean National Sports Federation of Sambo and Martial Arts
Colombian Sambo Federation
Sambo and Associated Sports Federation of Costa Rica
Amateur Federation of Sport and Combat Sambo of the Dominican Republic
Salvadoran Association of Sambo and Related Disciplines
National Sambo Association of Guatemala
Sambo and Combat Sambo Association of Mexico
Nicaraguan Sambo Federation
Panama Sambo Association
Peruvian Amateur Sambo Federation
Trinidad and Tobago Sambo and Combat Sambo Federation
Uruguayan Sambo and Combat Sambo Association
USA Sambo Inc.
Venezuelan Sambo Federation

Candidates
Antigua and Barbuda Antigua and Barbuda Sambo Association
Barbados Barbados Sambo Federation
Cuba Cuban Sambo and Allied Disciplines Association
Ecuador Sambo Clubs Association of Ecuador
Guyana Guyana Sambo and Combat Sambo Federation
Haiti Haitian Sambo Federation
Honduras Honduran Sambo Association
Jamaica Jamaica Sambo and Combat Sambo Federation
Paraguay Paraguayan Sambo Federation
Saint Lucia Sambo and Combat Sambo Federation of Saint Lucia

Europe
Members

Sambo Federation of Armenia
Azerbaijan Federation of Sambo
Public Organization "Belarusian Sambo Federation"
Belgian Sambo Federation
Bulgarian Sambo Federation
Croatian Sambo Federation
Cyprus Sambo Federation
Czech Sambo Union
Estonian Sambo Association
Finnish Sambo Federation
French Sambo Committee
Georgian National Federation of Sambo
German Sambo Federation
British Sombo Federation
Hellenic Federation Sambo, Kurash, Chidaoba
Hungarian Sambo Federation
Sambo Ireland
Sambo Federation of Israel
Italian Federation of Kickboxing, Muay Thai, Shootboxing, Savate, Sambo (F.I.KBMS)
Latvian Sambo Federation
Lithuanian Sambo Federation
Montenegro Sambo Federation
Dutch Sambo Federation
Polish Sambo Association
Sambo Federation of Moldova
Sambo Federation of North Macedonia
Romanian Sambo Federation
All-Russian Sambo Federation
Sambo Federation of Serbia
Sambo Federation Slovak Republic
Slovenian Sambo Federation
Spanish Federation of Olympic Wrestling and Associated Disciplines
Swiss Federation of Sambo and Associated Disciplines
Sambo Clubs Federation of Turkey
National Ukrainian Sambo Federation

Candidates

Members

The following are members of the Fédération Internationale de Sambo (2014-2016).
Africa - Confederation Africaine de Sambo Amateur

The Americas - Pan-American Amateur Sambo Federation

Asia - Asian Sambo Federation

Oceania - Australia/Oceania Sambo Federation

Europe - European Sambo Federation

Presidents
List of FIAS Presidents
 Fernando Compte (1992-1997)
 Tomoyuki Horimai (1997-2005)
 Mikhail Tikhomirov (2005)
 Vladimir Putin (2005-2009)
 David Rudman (2009-2013)
 Vasily Shestakov (2013-)

Events
Sambo at the 2013 Summer Universiade
Sambo at the 2013 World Combat Games
European Sambo Championships
World Sambo Championships

References

External links
 

Sports organizations established in 1984
International sports organizations
Sambo (martial art)
Martial arts organizations
Organisations based in Lausanne
Sambo